Although not a member of either the European Union or the European Economic Area, the Vatican City maintains an open border with Italy and is treated as part of the Schengen Area. Since the Vatican City is only accessible via Italy, entering the Vatican City is not possible without entering the Schengen Area first; hence Schengen visa rules apply de facto. Nevertheless, as the Vatican City has no tourist accommodations (hotels or rental apartments), it is therefore virtually impossible to stay overnight as a tourist.

Bilateral agreements

Vatican City signs independent visa-free agreements which are of symbolic value for foreign citizens but do have effect on Vatican passport holders.

See also

Visa requirements for Vatican citizens
Visa policy of the Schengen Area
List of diplomatic missions of Vatican City
Foreign relations of Vatican City
Tourism in Vatican City

References

Foreign relations of the Holy See
Vatican